Leona is a feminine given name.

Leona may also refer to:

Places in the United States 
 Leona, Kansas, a city
 Leona, Texas, a city
 Leona Creek, a stream in Texas

Arts and entertainment 
 Leona (film), a 2018 Mexican film
 Leona (instrument), a Mexican stringed instrument
 "Leona" (song), by Sawyer Brown, 1984
 "Leona", a song by Millencolin from Same Old Tunes (Tiny Tunes)

Other uses 
 Leona (skipper), a butterfly genus
 Leona (sternwheeler), an American steamship in service 1899–1912
 319 Leona, an asteroid
 Rosemary Leona, Vanuatuan businesswoman

See also 
 Jacopo da Leona (died 1277), Italian poet
 Leona Valley AVA, a wine region in Los Angeles County, California